369th may refer to:

369th (Croatian) Infantry Division (Wehrmacht), a so-called 'legionnaire' division of the Wehrmacht
369th Bombardment Squadron, inactive United States Air Force unit
369th Croatian Reinforced Infantry Regiment (Wehrmacht), unit of the German Wehrmacht that fought on the Eastern Front in World War II
369th Fighter Group, inactive United States Air Force unit
369th Fighter Squadron or 167th Airlift Squadron, unit of the West Virginia Air National Guard 167th Airlift Wing
369th Infantry Regiment (United States), infantry regiment of the United States Army National Guard that saw action in both World Wars
369th Regiment Armory, historic National Guard armory building located in Harlem, New York City
369th Signal Battalion (United States), United States Army Signal Battalion
369th Sustainment Brigade (United States), United States Army sustainment brigade of the 53rd Troop Command of the New York Army National Guard

See also
369 (number)
369, the year 369 (CCCLXIX) of the Julian calendar
369 BC